During 1991, tropical cyclones formed within seven different tropical cyclone basins, located within various parts of the Atlantic, Pacific and Indian Oceans. During the year, a total of 100 systems formed with 75 of these developing further and were named by the responsible warning centre. The deadliest tropical cyclone was Cyclone BOB 01, which caused 138,866 fatalities in Bangladesh, Northeastern India, Myanmar, Yunnan, while the costliest was Typhoon Mireille, which caused an estimated $10 billion USD in damage after striking Japan. Four Category 5 tropical cyclones formed in 1991.

Tropical cyclone activity in each basin is under the authority of an RSMC. The National Hurricane Center (NHC) is responsible for tropical cyclones in the North Atlantic and East Pacific. The Central Pacific Hurricane Center (CPHC) is responsible for tropical cyclones in the Central Pacific. Both the NHC and CPHC are subdivisions of the National Weather Service. Activity in the West Pacific is monitored by the Japan Meteorological Agency (JMA). Systems in the North Indian Ocean are monitored by the India Meteorological Department (IMD). The Météo-France located in Réunion (MFR) monitors tropical activity in the South-West Indian Ocean. The Australian region is monitored by five TCWCs that are under the coordination of the Australian Bureau of Meteorology (BOM). Similarly, the South Pacific is monitored by both the Fiji Meteorological Service (FMS) and the Meteorological Service of New Zealand Limited. Other, unofficial agencies that provide additional guidance in tropical cyclone monitoring include the Philippine Atmospheric, Geophysical and Astronomical Services Administration (PAGASA) and the Joint Typhoon Warning Center (JTWC).

Global conditions and hydrological summary

Summary

Systems

January

January was the least active in terms of tropical cyclogenesis and named storms, with three tropical systems formed, with two named storms formed. Tropical Cyclone Bella caused flooding in Rodrigues.

February

March

April

May

June

July

August

September

October

November

December

Global effects

See also

 Tropical cyclones by year
 List of earthquakes in 1991
 Tornadoes of 1991

Notes

1 Only systems that formed either on or after January 1, 1991  are counted in the seasonal totals.
2 Only systems that formed either before or on December 31, 1991 are counted in the seasonal totals.3 The wind speeds for this tropical cyclone/basin are based on the IMD Scale which uses 3-minute sustained winds.
4 The wind speeds for this tropical cyclone/basin are based on the Saffir Simpson Scale which uses 1-minute sustained winds.5The wind speeds for this tropical cyclone are based on Météo-France which uses gust winds.

References

External links 

Regional Specialized Meteorological Centers
 US National Hurricane Center – North Atlantic, Eastern Pacific
 Central Pacific Hurricane Center – Central Pacific
 Japan Meteorological Agency – NW Pacific
 India Meteorological Department – Bay of Bengal and the Arabian Sea
 Météo-France – La Reunion – South Indian Ocean from 30°E to 90°E
 Fiji Meteorological Service – South Pacific west of 160°E, north of 25° S

Tropical Cyclone Warning Centers
 Meteorology, Climatology, and Geophysical Agency of Indonesia – South Indian Ocean from 90°E to 141°E, generally north of 10°S
 Australian Bureau of Meteorology (TCWC's Perth, Darwin & Brisbane) – South Indian Ocean & South Pacific Ocean from 90°E to 160°E, generally south of 10°S
 Papua New Guinea National Weather Service – South Pacific Ocean from 141°E to 160°E, generally north of 10°S
 Meteorological Service of New Zealand Limited – South Pacific west of 160°E, south of 25°S

Tropical cyclones by year
1991 Atlantic hurricane season
1991 Pacific hurricane season
1991 Pacific typhoon season
1991 North Indian Ocean cyclone season
1990–91 Australian region cyclone season
1991–92 Australian region cyclone season
1990–91 South Pacific cyclone season
1991–92 South Pacific cyclone season
1990–91 South-West Indian Ocean cyclone season
1991–92 South-West Indian Ocean cyclone season
1991-related lists